Alla Nikolayevna Zhilyaeva (born 5 February 1969) is a female long-distance runner from Russia. She set a Russian national record for the women's  10,000 metres at the 2003 World Championships in Athletics, with a time of 30:23.07.

International competitions

Professional road races

Personal bests

References

External links 
SportPhoto.ru  : Persons : Alla Zhilyaeva

1969 births
Living people
Russian female long-distance runners
Russian female cross country runners
Russian female marathon runners
Olympic female marathon runners
Olympic athletes of Russia
Athletes (track and field) at the 1996 Summer Olympics
World Athletics Championships athletes for Russia
Russian Athletics Championships winners
Russian masters athletes
World record holders in masters athletics